Meredith and Co. is a classic children's novel with a school setting by George Mills. It was first published in 1933. Meredith and Co. and its sequel, King Willow (1938), were popular from their initial publications, through at least one reprinting in the late 1950s.

Plot summary
The novel follows the adventures of Meredith (Muggs), a Sixth Form prefect at fictional Leadham House Preparatory School in England, and the adventures he has with his friends Hawk, Pongo, Clayton, Pigface, Renton, and Murray as well as a ubiquitous and beloved bulldog named Uggles.

Publishing history
The text was originally published in 1933 by Oxford University Press, London, and was illustrated with plates by C. E. Brock.  It was reprinted by the same publishing house in 1950 with new illustrations signed "D. White".

Meredith and Co. was reprinted by Andrew Dakers, Ltd., London, and printed in Czechoslovakia.  The undated text is circa 1957.  Its new illustrations updated the look of the characters to the post-war period of the United Kingdom, and were done by an illustrator who signed his work "Vernon".

Reception
According to Dr. Thomas Houston of Windlesham House School, Brighton, Meredith and Co. was exceptional as it "captured the idiom of pupils during the interwar period more accurately than any other novel."

See also

References

External links
Who Is George Mills?

1933 British novels
1933 children's books
British children's novels
20th-century British children's literature
Novels set in elementary and primary schools
Oxford University Press books